The W315 is a mobile phone model produced by Motorola. It is offered by United States CDMA providers. 

Major CDMA carriers include Verizon and Cricket.

Specifications
 Specs Source: Motorola w315
 Modes: CDMA 1x 850 MHz/1900 MHz (1.9 GHz) & AMPS (Analog) 850 MHz
 Weight: 80 g
 Dimensions: 88 x 50 x 12.2 mm
 Form Factor: Clamshell
 Antenna: External Extendable Stub
 Battery Life: Talk: 308 minutes, Standby: 408 hours
 Battery Type: Lithium-ion 1000 mAh
 Internal Display: LCD (Color CSTN), 165,536 colors (16-bit), 128 x 160 pixels
 External Display: Monochrome
 Phone Book Capacity: 	2000
 Internet Browser: WAP 2.0 Dual Stack with openwave 6.2.5
 Connectivity:	CE bus (mini USB)
 300Mb Memory 1945Kb Ram For Brew Apps
 Sound formats supported: .mid, .midi, Custom tones, Voice Memos

External links
 Official Motorola website

W315